Košťany nad Turcom is a village and municipality in Martin District, in Turiec territory, and in Žilina Region of northern Slovakia.

History
In historical records of the village, a dwelling 'villa Coschan' was first mentioned in year 1323.
Main occupation of locals has been focused on agriculture and seasonal food-harvests that were produced for various landlords who resided in Košťany nad Turcom ever since.

Abandoning feudal servitude Feudalism in 1848 and declaring basic freedom rights led residents to develop more commercial activities such crafts and trade. In the 20th century, especially during communist regime Joint agriculture and farming Collective farming remained major daily bread for locals.

Early years of new millennium have seen legislative support towards larger businesses, which led to few industrial factories growth in Košťany nad Turcom.
In fact, most residents commute to Martin Martin, Slovakia, major workhub in Turiec.

Geography
The village settlement lies at an altitude of 410 metres and covers an area of 6.436 km². It has a population of about 1,095 people. It lies on Turiec river, Košťany nad Turcom as the whole Turiec basin (Turčianska kotlina) are surrounded by mountain range Greater Fatra (Veľká Fatra) on east-north and by mountain range Lesser Fatra (Malá Fatra) on west.

Places of interest
Košťany nad Turcom as other allied villages in Turiec lies in picturesque scenery. Near mountain ranges offer abundance of outdoor opportunities; from trekking or bouldering in summer, to cross-country skiing or kiteboarding in winter. Local castle ruins sightseeing, geocaching, mountain-biking etc.

Turiec region is also rich in precious mineral water sources, or you can visit few of the left sheep-farming chalets called 'salaš' scattered on the hill tops. If you are not that lucky to find them, then try ruins of ancient castles List of castles in Slovakia in few neighbor villages.

On the top of landscape beauty, 3 km north of the village sits forest area 'Jahodnícke Háje', with hidden 'skanzen'. Skanzen is another name in Slovakia for an open-air museum. From all open-air museums in Slovakia, Jahodnícke háje (or Martin) skanzen is the largest one and it's worth to pay a visit especially during Christian holidays (recommended are Christmas and Easter..) as presentations of life from ancient times, markets with historical items, marches, and dances occur regularly. Dwelling houses, barns, church, and even taverna have been carefully replaced from various parts of Slovakian rural areas, brought to skanzen grounds and rebuilt in original style. http://www.skanzenmartin.sk/ (see map in external links for directions)

Notable residents 
Ivan Zbíňovský, Merchant, amateur entomologist and lepidopterologist
Andrej Polonec, writer

Images

Genealogical resources

The records for genealogical research are available at the state archive "Statny Archiv in Bytca, Slovakia"

 Roman Catholic church records (births/marriages/deaths): 1773-1941 (parish B)
 Lutheran church records (births/marriages/deaths): 1783-1928 (parish B)

See also
 List of municipalities and towns in Slovakia

References

External links
 council website: http://www.kostanynadturcom.sk
 local recommendations by Tupalo: http://tupalo.com/en/search?q=martin%2C+slovakia&commit=Search
 flag and coat of arms: http://www.crwflags.com/fotw/flags/sk-mt-kt.html#kt
 detailed map: http://mapper.acme.com/?ll=49.03832,18.92498&z=12&t=M&marker0=49.03333%2C18.90000%2CKo%C5%A1%C5%A5any%20nad%20Turcom&marker1=49.03832%2C18.92498%2C3.2%20km%20S%20of%20Martin
 slovak web about hiking around Turiec: http://hiking.sk/hk/li/-mala_fatra.html
 images on Flickr: https://www.flickr.com/map/?fLat=49.033333&fLon=18.9&zl=5
 images on Panoramio: https://web.archive.org/web/20141219052551/http://www.panoramio.com/map#lt=49.028035&ln=18.905021&z=2&k=1&a=1&tab=1#lt=49.028035&ln=18.905021&z=2&k=1&a=1&tab=1
Surnames of living people in Kostany nad Turcom

Villages and municipalities in Martin District